Răzvan Tudor Damian (born 15 July 1983) is a Romanian professional footballer who plays as a defender for Liga III side KSE Târgu Secuiesc.

References

External links
 
 

1983 births
Living people
Sportspeople from Brașov
Romanian footballers
Association football defenders
Liga I players
Liga II players
FC Astra Giurgiu players
CSM Corona Brașov footballers
AFC Săgeata Năvodari players
Sepsi OSK Sfântu Gheorghe players
SR Brașov players